Podocarpus oleifolius is a species of conifer in the family Podocarpaceae. It is found in Colombia, Costa Rica, Ecuador, El Salvador, Guatemala, Honduras, Mexico, Panama, Peru, and Venezuela.

Podocarpus oleifolius contains one subspecies, P. oleifolius subsp. costaricensis, which is considered to encompass all Central American examples of the species.

References

oleifolius
Least concern plants
Trees of Colombia
Trees of Costa Rica
Trees of Ecuador
Trees of El Salvador
Trees of Guatemala
Trees of Honduras
Trees of Mexico
Trees of Panama
Trees of Peru
Trees of Venezuela
Taxonomy articles created by Polbot
Flora of the Talamancan montane forests